Abhinav Puri (born 22 July 1994) is an Indian cricketer who plays for Jammu and Kashmir. He made his first-class debut on 23 November 2015 in the 2015–16 Ranji Trophy.

References

External links
 

1994 births
Living people
Indian cricketers
Jammu and Kashmir cricketers
People from Jammu